Peggy, the Will O' the Wisp is a lost 1917 American drama film directed by Tod Browning.

Plot
As described in a film magazine review, Neil Dacey (Carrigan) loves Peggy Desmond (Taliaferro). Terence O'Malley (Sack), nephew of Squire O'Malley (Ryan), is anxious to win Peggy. Terence and his uncle have a quarrel because Terence cannot win Peggy, and the squire is killed. Terence does the killing with Neil's gun, so Neil is held for the murder. Peggy, to save her fiance, dresses as the will-o'-the-wisp, and this results in a confession by Terence.

Cast
 Mabel Taliaferro as Peggy Desmond
 Thomas Carrigan as Captain Neil Dacey (as Thomas J. Carrigan)
 William J. Gross as Anthony Desmond (as W.J. Gross)
 Sam Ryan as Squire O'Malley (as Sam J. Ryan)
 Nathaniel Sack as Terence O'Malley (as Nathan Sack)
 Thomas O'Malley as Shamus Donnelly (as Thomas F. O'Malley)
 Florence Ashbrooke as Sarah
 Clara Blandick as Mrs. Donnelly
 John J. Williams as Muldoon (as J.J. Williams)

References

External links

1917 films
1917 drama films
1917 lost films
Silent American drama films
American silent feature films
American black-and-white films
Films directed by Tod Browning
Lost American films
Metro Pictures films
Lost drama films
1910s American films